Pyganodon is a genus of freshwater mussels, aquatic bivalve mollusks in the subfamily Unioninae of the family Unionidae, the river mussels.

Species within the genus Pyganodon
 Pyganodon cataracta (Say, 1817)
 Pyganodon fragilis (Lamarck, 1819)
 Pyganodon gibbosa (Say, 1824)
 Pyganodon grandis (Say, 1829)
 Pyganodon lacustris (I. Lea, 1857)
Synonyms
 Pyganodon implicata (Say, 1829): synonym of Utterbackiana implicata (Say, 1829)
 Pyganodon lugubris (Say, 1829): synonym of Pyganodon grandis (Say, 1829)
 Pyganodon marginata (Say, 1817): synonym of Pyganodon cataracta (Say, 1817)
 Pyganodon simpsonaia (I. Lea, 1861): synonym of Pyganodon grandis (Say, 1829)
 Pyganodon simpsoniana (I. Lea, 1861): synonym of Pyganodon grandis (Say, 1829)

References

 Williams, J. D.; Bogan, A. E.; Garner, J. T. (2008). Freshwater mussels of Alabama and the Mobile Basin in Georgia, Mississippi and Tennessee. University of Alabama Press, Tuscaloosa. 908 pp.
 InvertEBase. (2015). Authority files of U.S. and Canadian land and freshwater mollusks developed for the InvertEBase project (invertebase.org).

 
Bivalve genera
Taxonomy articles created by Polbot